KISL (88.7 FM) is a radio station licensed to Avalon, California, United States, the station serves the Avalon area. The station is owned by Catalina Island Performing Arts Foundation.

History
The station was assigned the call letters KPJO on September 2, 1988.  On  September 24, 1993, the station's call sign was changed to KISL. On April 3, 2006, it was changed again to KXLW, and on May 17, 2006, it was returned to KISL.

See also
List of community radio stations in the United States

References

External links
KISL Website

ISL
Community radio stations in the United States
Independent Public Radio
Santa Catalina Island (California)
Mass media in Los Angeles County, California
Radio stations established in 1988
1988 establishments in California